Zapin (Jawi: زافين) is one of the most popular dance and musical forms in traditional Malay performing arts. Dance movements are choreographed to melodies which are performed using musical instruments such as the gambus (short-necked lute), accordion and rebana.
It is believed to have been introduced by Persian and Arab Muslim missionaries from the Middle East to Malay Archipelago around the fourteenth century where back then only males were allowed to perform; nowadays, female dancers are included. It used to be performed exclusively for religious ceremonies but through the years it has become a form of traditional entertainment, hence the participation of female dancers is allowed.

Instruments

The dancers usually perform in pairs and are accompanied by musicians playing the Accordion, Violin, Gambus, Gendang, Marwas/Marawis, and Rebana.

Distributions
Presently, zapin remains an integral part of the regional Malay performing arts scene, particularly in Brunei Darussalam, Malaysia and Singapore. 
In Malaysia, Zapin is mostly associated with the Malaysian southern state of Johor.
In Indonesia, Zapin is mostly associated and classified as part of Malay cultures especially in terms of traditional dances and traditions in Malay-populated areas in Sumatra, Riau Islands, Bangka Belitung Islands, and Kalimantan.

Types 
There are numerous types of Zapin, and each type varies by the movement and style of dance:
 Zapin 12 Kuala Kampar (Pelalawan and Penyalai)
 Zapin Api (Riau)
 Zapin Anak Ayam (North Sumatra)
 Zapin Arab (Pontianak and Johor)
 Zapin Asli (North Sumatra)
 Zapin Balumpa (South East Sulawesi)
 Zapin Banjar (Banjarmasin)
 Zapin Batuah (South Kalimantan)
 Zapin Bedana (Lampung)
 Zapin Bengkalis (Bengkalis, Riau)
 Zapin Betawi (Jakarta)
 Zapin Brunei (Brunei and North Borneo)
 Zapin Bujang (Riau)
 Zapin Bujang Marindu (South Kalimantan)
 Zapin Carita (Banjarmasin)
 Zapin Cek Esah (Riau Islands)
 Zapin Dana (Jambi, South Sumatra and Bengkulu)
 Zapin Dana-Dana (Gorontalo)
 Zapin Dana-Dani (Nusa Tenggara)
 Zapin Dana Sarah (Jambi)
 Zapin Dara (Riau and West Sumatra)
 Zapin Deli (Deli Serdang, North Sumatra)
 Zapin Diang Marindu (South Kalimantan)
 Zapin Dua Saudara (South Kalimantan)
 Zapin Duo (Riau)
 Zapin Empat-Empat (West Kalimantan)
 Zapin Eroh (Kutai Kartanegara, East Kalimantan)
 Zapin Galuh Langkar South Kalimantan
 Zapin Gambus (Perak)
 Zapin Genjoh (Mahakam)
 Zapin Ghalet (Kedah)
 Zapin Hadrah (South Kalimantan)
 Zapin Istana (Siak)
 Zapin Jambi (Jambi)
 Zapin Kaltara (North Kalimantan)
 Zapin Kamang (West Sumatra)
 Zapin Kampong Bolak (Riau)
 Zapin Kampung Manggis (Jambi)
 Zapin Kasih dan Budi (South Sumatra and Riau)
 Zapin Kepri (Riau Islands)
 Zapin Kerinci (Kerinci, Jambi)
 Zapin Keris (West Kalimantan)
 Zapin Kinsat Suara Siam (North Kalimantan)
 Zapin Kipas (West Kalimantan and Riau)
 Zapin Kores (Johor)
 Zapin Kuala (Banjar Kuala, South Kalimantan)
 Zapin Kute (Riau Islands)
 Zapin Lancang Kuning (Riau)
 Zapin Langkah (West Kalimantan)
 Zapin Langkah Bujur Serong (Pontianak, West Kalimantan)
 Zapin Langkah Penghibur Pengantin (West Kalimantan)
 Zapin Langkah Simpang (Pontianak, West Kalimantan)
 Zapin Lapis Batu Putih (Johor)
 Zapin Lembut (West Kalimantan)
 Zapin Lenga (Johor)
 Zapin Lenggang Banua (South Kalimantan)
 Zapin Lenggok Gambus (Pekan Labuhan, North Sumatra)
 Zapin Mabuk Kepayang (North Sumatra)
 Zapin Maharani (Pelalawan)
 Zapin Mandiling (Bawean)
 Zapin Massal (West Kalimantan)
 Zapin Melayu (Riau)
 Zapin Melayu Johor (Johor)
 Zapin Melayu Pontianak (Pontianak)
 Zapin Meskom (Bengkalis, Riau)
 Zapin Nelayan (Riau)
 Zapin Padang Changkat (Perak)
 Zapin Padang Sari (Johor)
 Zapin Palembang (Palembang)
 Zapin Parit Lengkong (West Kalimantan)
 Zapin Parit Mastar (Johor)
 Zapin Pasanggrahan (South Kalimantan)
 Zapin Pat Lipat (Johor)
 Zapin Payung (West Kalimantan)
 Zapin Pecah Dua Belas (Pelalawan)
 Zapin Pekajang (Johor)
 Zapin Pekan (Riau, Sumatra)
 Zapin Penyengat (Penyengat)
 Zapin Pesisir (Riau Islands)
 Zapin Pintal Tali Sukadana (West Kalimantan)
 Zapin Pisau (Pontianak, West Kalimantan)
 Zapin Pulau (Johor)
 Zapin Putar Alam (Johor)
 Zapin Rantauan (South Kalimantan)
 Zapin Rao (Rao, Pasaman, West Sumatra)
 Zapin Rindu-Rindu (South Kalimantan)
 Zapin Rotan (West Kalimantan)
 Zapin Salor (Kelantan)
 Zapin Sebat (Sarawak)
 Zapin Seberang (Jambi)
 Zapin Sekaki (North Sumatera)
 Zapin Selat Panjang (Selat Panjang)
 Zapin Selendang (West Kalimantan)
 Zapin Sengarong (Sanggau, West Kalimantan)
 Zapin Senggayong (North Kayong, West Kalimantan)
 Zapin Sentak Kamang (Padangpanjang, West Sumatra)
 Zapin Serdang (Serdang, North Sumatra)
 Zapin Seri Bunian (Pekalongan and Johor)
 Zapin Siak (Siak)
 Zapin Siak Bermadah (Siak)
 Zapin Siak Sri Indrapura (Siak)
 Zapin Sigam (Sigam, South Kalimantan)
 Zapin Sindang (Sarawak)
 Zapin Singapura (Singapore)
 Zapin Sisit (South Kalimantan)
 Zapin Susun Sirih (West Kalimantan)
 Zapin Tahtul (South Kalimantan)
 Zapin Tali (West Kalimantan)
 Zapin Tali Bui (West Kalimantan)
 Zapin Tamiang (Aceh Tamiang)
 Zapin Tanjung Labuh (Johor)
 Zapin Tembung (West Kalimantan)
 Zapin Tembung Pendek (Pontianak, West Kalimantan)
 Zapin Tempurung (Melawi, West Kalimantan)
 Zapin Tenglu (Johor)
 Zapin Tidung Ulu (Tana Tidung, North Kalimantan)
 Zapin Tuan Haji (South Kalimantan)
 Zapin Tuan Syarif (South Kalimantan)
 Zapin Tongga (Minangkabau)

See also
 Zaffa

References

External links
Information on Zapin characteristics
 The gambus (lutes) of the Malay world: its origins and significance in zapin Music, Larry Hilarian, Nanyang Technological University, Singapore, 6 July 2004
 Charles Capwell, Contemporary Manifestations of Yemeni-Derived Song and Dance in Indonesia, Yearbook for Traditional Music, Vol. 27, (1995), pp. 76–89
 Mohd Anis Md Nor,  Zapin: Folk Dance of the Malay World, Singapore: Oxford University Press, 1993
 uyepedia

Malay culture
Malay dances
Indonesian culture
Malaysian culture
Dances of Sumatra
Partial squatting position